Paralympics Ireland (formerly known as the Paralympic Council of Ireland) is the National Paralympic Committee in Ireland for the Paralympic Games movement. It is a non-profit organisation that selects teams, and raises funds to send Irish competitors to Paralympic events organised by the International Paralympic Committee (IPC).

History

The organisation was established the Paralympic Council of Ireland in 1987, as a Coordination Committee for the 1988 Summer Paralympics. They rebranded with a new logo in 2005. The organisation rebranded again in 2011 with a new logo and a name change to Paralympics Ireland. They launched a new tagline, Inspiring Beyond Belief.

Paralympics Ireland coordinates Ireland at the Paralympics and Ireland at the World Championships.

See also
Olympic Federation of Ireland

References

External links
 Official website

Ireland
Ireland at the Paralympics
Pa
1987 establishments in Ireland
Disability organisations based in the Republic of Ireland